The Battle of Butuí took place on June 26, 1865 in the Butuí or M'Butuí stream between the municipalities of São Borja and Itaqui in Rio Grande do Sul during the Paraguayan War.

The battle

The advance of Lieutenant-Colonel Estigarribia's troops was constantly hampered by the incursions of Brazilian detachments on their way to Uruguaiana, especially São Borja and Itaqui. On June 26, a Paraguayan column of 500 men under the command of Major José Lopez and 2,000 soldiers of the Brazilian National Guard, under the command of Colonel Fernandes Lima initially engaged in skirmishes. The battle resulted in 236 Paraguayan casualties and 115 on the Brazilian side. With a numerical superiority of 4 to 1, the Brazilians defeated the Paraguayans and they retreated to the main division of Lieutenant-Colonel Estigarribia.

References

Butuí
Butuí
Butuí
Butuí
June 1865 events
History of Rio Grande do Sul